"Kiss Me thru the Phone" is a song co-written and recorded by hip hop artist Soulja Boy featuring Sammie. It was released on November 27, 2008, as the second single from his 2008 album, iSouljaBoyTellem. It was the best-selling single from the album, reaching number three on the U.S. Billboard Hot 100, number one on the U.S. Rap Charts, the top 10 in the United Kingdom, in Canada, on the U.S. Billboard Pop 100, and in New Zealand.

R&B singer Chris Brown was Soulja Boy's first choice to sing the hook, but Brown turned down the offer. Soulja Boy then tried to sing it on his own with Autotune but found it "garbage", and ended up collaborating with Sammie. "Kiss Me thru The Phone" was 2009's eighth best selling single with over 5.7 million copies sold worldwide.

Chart performance and sales
"Kiss Me thru the Phone" became highly successful for both Soulja Boy and Sammie on the charts. The single peaked at number 12 on the Billboard Bubbling Under R&B/Hip-Hop Singles chart. The song then hit number one on the Bubbling Under R&B/Hip-Hop Singles on the week of January 3, 2009. The song later debuted at number 71 on the U.S. Billboard Hot 100 on the week of January 10, 2009 and peaked at number three, making it Soulja Boy's second top five hit on the US charts since 2007's "Crank That". Also it would eventually start to chart on the Hot R&B/Hip-Hop Songs in the top ten at number four. The song has also debuted at number 71 on the Canadian Hot 100 and peaked at number 10. The song has reached number 1 on Hot Rap Tracks. The video ranked at number 14 on BET's Notarized: Top 100 Videos of 2009 countdown.

The song has sold over 2,261,000 digital downloads in the United States, becoming his second song to reach the two million mark in downloads, the first being "Crank That".

In New Zealand, the song debuted at number eleven on February 2, 2009, and later peaked at number two. It was certified Platinum by the RIANZ on July 12, 2009 with 15,000 digital downloads.

In the United Kingdom, "Kiss Me thru the Phone" debuted on the UK Singles Chart at number 63 on May 3, 2009, on downloads alone; the single has since peaked at number six. It held a position on BBC Radio 1's A-List. To date the single has sold more than 5 million copies worldwide.

Music video
The music video was shot in New Orleans, Louisiana and Atlanta, Georgia at the Kelley residence. The video shows Soulja Boy doing his daily routine, when his girlfriend misses him and calls him, and shoots a video of herself making a kissing face on an iPhone and sends it to him.

The video features Sammie and cameos from Arab, J-Bar, Vistoso Bosses, Vanessa Simmons, Miami Mike, and Dennis Rodman. The music video premiered on December 15, 2008, a day before the album's release. It also peaked number one on BET's video countdown, 106 & Park and ranked at number 16 on BET's Notarized: Top 100 Videos of 2009 countdown.

Track listings
CD single
 "Kiss Me thru the Phone" (Main version) - 3:11
 "Kiss Me thru the Phone" (Instrumental) - 3:11

Australian CD single
 "Kiss Me thru the Phone" (Main) - 3:14
 "Bird Walk" (Main) - 3:33

Digital download
 "Kiss Me thru the Phone"

Charts

Weekly charts

Monthly charts

Year-end charts

Certifications

Telephone number

The telephone number, (678) 999-8212, given in the song, if dialed from the United States, previously connected to a message system for the artist; the number now belongs to an unknown commercial advertiser in Georgia. An unsuspecting family in Greater Manchester, England found themselves inundated with calls from Soulja Boy fans there who dialed the number.

References

2008 songs
2008 singles
Sammie songs
Soulja Boy songs
Song recordings produced by Jim Jonsin
Songs written by Soulja Boy
Songs written by Jim Jonsin
Songs written by David Siegel (musician)
Songs about telephone calls
Songs about kissing
Music videos directed by Dale Resteghini
Pop-rap songs